Alan Kane may refer to:

 Alan Kane (artist), British contemporary artist
 Alan Kane (author), author of Scrambles in the Canadian Rockies
 Alan Kane (Gaelic footballer), Irish sportsperson who represented Donegal
 Alan Kane (politician), former Democratic Unionist Party politician from Northern Ireland

See also
Alan Cain, Australian sailor